The 2005 WGC-World Cup took place 17–20 November at the Oceânico Golf on its Victoria Course in Vilamoura, Algarve, Portugal. It was the 51st World Cup and the sixth as a World Golf Championship event.

The course was designed by Arnold Palmer and opened in 2004, the year before it hosted the World Cup. Eleven years after this tournament, in 2016, Dom Pedro Golf acquired the Victoria Course and four other Vilamoura courses from Oceânico Golf.

24 countries competed and each country sent two players. The prize money totaled $4,000,000 with $1,400,000 going to the winning pair. The Welsh team of Stephen Dodd and Bradley Dredge won. They won by two strokes over the English and Swedish teams after the event was shortened to 54 holes due to rain.

Qualification and format
The defending champion was joined by 18 teams based on the Official World Golf Ranking and five teams via qualification.

The tournament was scheduled to be a 72-hole stroke play team event with each team consisting of two players. The first and third days were fourball play and the second and final days were foursomes play. The final round was canceled due to rain.

Teams

Scores

Source

References

External links
Victoria Clube de Golfe official site

World Cup (men's golf)
Golf tournaments in Portugal
Sport in Algarve
WGC-World Cup
World Cup golf
World Cup golf